Dogwood Heights is an unincorporated community located in Wayne County, Tennessee.

References

Unincorporated communities in Tennessee
Unincorporated communities in Wayne County, Tennessee